"All That's Left Is Love" is a song by the American rock band, Angels & Airwaves. The song was released on April 16, 2020 as a non-album single, though it was included as a bonus track on the Japanese edition of Lifeforms (2021). The song was written by Tom DeLonge, Ilan Rubin, and Aaron Rubin.

Background 
"All That's Left Is Love" was written directly about the global impact of the COVID-19 pandemic, and about being optimistic of the future during troubling times. In a public statement, DeLonge revealed the message of the song:“Friends — as we are all stuck at home and watching these unfortunate world events unfold, we couldn’t help but notice little glimmers of light showing across the globe — revealing the positive side of humanity that sometimes gets lost in our day-to-day lives. That, ultimately, is what this band has been about since day one — HOPE. With all of that in mind, we decided to channel our feelings into a song."

Release and reception 
The band began to tease the song on their social media platforms before officially announcing its release to be April 16, 2020. It was premiered on Apple Music's Beats 1 radio station before being released digitally. Alongside the release, it was revealed that all proceeds from the song would be donated to the nonprofit organization Feeding America's COVID-19 relief fund. During an interview with Apple Music's Zane Lowe, DeLonge discussed the decision to donate all of the song's profits to the charity:“I’ve handed out food on holidays and for people in need. I’ve gone to schools and handed out food to a lot of these kids only get their meals at school. And a lot of people think that the United States obviously is a more wealthy country than other, but there’s still so much poverty here. As you know, you live in Los Angeles, and so you can see that there’s a disparity between the classes. It was very simple for me to make one phone call and say, ‘Why don’t we do this? Because this is something that everybody needs right now. People can’t take care of their families. Kids are not in schools where they’re getting their only meal of the day.’ It kind of worked out, and that’s how you know it’s meant to be. I’m super proud to be with Feeding America on this.”The song was met with mostly positive feedback. Billboard's Gil Kaufman felt that the song's second verse "pretty well sums up what a lot of us are feeling these days" in reference to the social impact of the pandemic. Josiah Hughes of Exclaim! called the song "another inspiring piece of uplifting alt pop. The song is four minutes long, but never overstays its welcome as it builds and expands." Emily Tan of SPIN felt that the song "starts off slow, but then grows into a pretty empowering anthem."

Music video 
DeLonge released a teaser for a music video on his Instagram on June 23, 2020. In the post, he discussed how the original intention for the video was to represent hope of overcoming COVID-19, but felt that it should also represent the band's support of the Black community in the United States in response to the George Floyd protests."We made this video last month during an already unprecedented and uneasy time for our world. Since then, there have been more important issues in this country that naturally shifted our collective focus and voice in support of the Black community. That focus has not ended or slowed, our fight for equality and justice is just beginning - the time is NOW. As we continue to educate ourselves and put in the work each day, we decided we wanted to share this with you. “All That’s Left Is Love” represents an idea that we hold firm to during these times - at our core we are connected, through support and compassion we can get through this world united, and together we are LOVE."The video was released on June 25, 2020. In the video, Delonge is seen singing and dancing to the song by himself in various different locations, as to represent the feelings of isolation that many have felt the pandemic has caused. The video also opens with a quote from DeLonge addressing both the pandemic and racial issues; “We never appreciate the connection we have with others until it’s gone,” he says. “And although we may not be able to change this first part of this story, we can for sure change the ending.”

Track listing 

 Digital download

 "All That's Left Is Love" – 4:05

Personnel 
Angels & Airwaves

 Tom DeLonge – vocals, guitar, synthesizers, songwriting, producer
 Ilan Rubin – drums, backing vocals, guitars, bass guitar, keyboards, songwriting, producer
 David Kennedy – producer

Production

 Aaron Rubin – producer, songwriting, engineer
 Ben Moore – engineer
 Tony Hoffer – engineer
 Tom Baker – engineer
 Tom Lord Alge - mix engineer

References 

2020 songs
2020 singles
Angels & Airwaves songs
Rise Records singles
Songs written by Tom DeLonge
Songs written by Ilan Rubin
Songs about the COVID-19 pandemic